The 2022 Western Carolina Catamounts football team represented the Western Carolina University as a member of the Southern Conference (SoCon) during the 2022 NCAA Division I FCS football season. Led by second-year head coach Kerwin Bell the Catamounts played their home games at Bob Waters Field at E. J. Whitmire Stadium in Cullowhee, North Carolina.

Previous season

The Catamounts finished the 2021 season with a record of 4–7, 4–4 in Southern Conference play to finish in a 3-way tie for fourth place.

Schedule

Game summaries

at Charleston Southern

at Georgia Tech

Presbyterian

at No. 21 Samford

VMI

at No. 12 Mercer

at Furman

The Citadel

Wofford

at East Tennessee State

No. 15 Chattanooga

References

Western Carolina
Western Carolina Catamounts football seasons
Western Carolina Catamounts football